Hettingen is a town in the district of Sigmaringen, in Baden-Württemberg, Germany. It is situated 14 km north of Sigmaringen. Hettingen absorbed the formerly independent municipality Inneringen in 1975.

Mayors
Uwe Bühler was elected mayor in October 2008. Bühler died in 2011 at the age of 50 from cancer, In February 2012 Dagmar Kuster was elected mayor.

Mayor of Hettingen
 till 1974: Johann Knaus (CDU)

Mayors of von Inneringen
 1905–1933: Josef Kempf
 1933–1945: Wilhelm Fritz
 1945–1948: Johann Georg Ott
 1949–1974: Johann Georg Brandstetter

Mayors of Hettingen after merger with Inneringen
 1975–1999: Johannes Müller (CDU)
 1999–2008: Stefan Bubeck (CDU)
 2008–2011: Uwe Bühler (CDU)
 since 2012: Dagmar Kuster

References

Sigmaringen (district)